Delaware's 19th Senate district is one of 21 districts in the Delaware Senate. It has been represented by Republican Brian Pettyjohn since 2012.

Geography
District 19 covers central Sussex County, including the communities of Georgetown, Bridgeville, and Long Neck. It borders the state of Maryland.

Like all districts in the state, the 19th Senate district is located entirely within Delaware's at-large congressional district. It overlaps with the 20th, 35th, 36th, 37th, 39th, 40th, and 41st districts of the Delaware House of Representatives.

Recent election results
Delaware Senators are elected to staggered four-year terms. Under normal circumstances, the 19th district holds elections in presidential years, except immediately after redistricting, when all seats are up for election regardless of usual cycle.

2020

2016

2012

Federal and statewide results in District 19

References 

19
Sussex County, Delaware